, also known as Terry, was a Japanese instrumental rock guitarist. His preferred guitar was a black Mosrite with a white pickguard. His guitar sound was characterized by frenetic picking, heavy use of tremolo picking and frequent use of his guitar's vibrato arm.

Terauchi started his career playing rhythm guitar for a country and Western act "Jimmie Tokita & His Mountain Playboys", which had bassist Chosuke Ikariya. In 1962 he formed his first group, The Blue Jeans. However, in 1966 he left the group and formed The Bunnys with whom he played. In May 1967, he also established his own company named "Teraon". He won the "arrangement award" with the song "Let's Go Unmei" at the 9th Japan Record Awards in 1967. He left the Bunnys in 1968. He reformed the Blue Jeans in 1969 and the band has been active until today.

On November 26, 2008, Takeshi Terauchi and the Blue Jeans released the album Mr. Legend from King Records.

Filmography
 (1965)

References

External links
Official Website 

 
Discography
Very Thorough Discography

1939 births
2021 deaths
Japanese rock guitarists
King Records (Japan) artists
Musicians from Ibaraki Prefecture
Surf musicians